Lee Soo-Nam (Hangul: 이수남, Hanja: 李秀男, 2 February 1927 - 8 January 1984) is a South Korean football forward who played for the South Korea in the 1954 FIFA World Cup. He also played for Seoul Football Club.

He was football referee from 1962.

References

External links
FIFA profile

1927 births
1984 deaths
Footballers from Seoul
South Korean footballers
South Korea international footballers
Association football forwards
1954 FIFA World Cup players
South Korean football referees
Asian Games medalists in football
Footballers at the 1958 Asian Games
1956 AFC Asian Cup players
AFC Asian Cup-winning players
Asian Games silver medalists for South Korea
Medalists at the 1958 Asian Games